Jatni can refer to:
 A female Jat
 Jatani or Jatni, a town in Odisha, India.